Atauro may be:
a dialect or alternative name of the Papuan Adabe language spoken on mainland East Timor
the dialects of Wetarese spoken on Atauro Island